Caddington F.C. are a football club based in Caddington, near Luton, England.

History
The club was re-formed in 1973 after an absence of local football in the village and has been continuous since then but there had been previous Caddington teams before this time and the local history society "Caddhist" has a good selection of photos with dates of teams in the 1950s In 1981 the club moved to their current home of Caddington & District Sports & Social Club.

They joined the South Midlands League Division One in 1986. In the 1996–97 season the club came runners up in Division one but instead of being promoted to the Premier Division, they were placed in the Spartan South Midlands League Senior Division when the Spartan League merged with South Midlands League. The club remained in the Senior Division, later renamed Division one in 2000, until the 2000–01 season, when they were relegated to Division two. The club dropped out of the South Midland League early in the 2013–14 season after being unable to field a team for two successive games, entering Division One of the West Herts League the following season. They were Division One runners-up in 2015–16, earning promotion to the Premier Division.

References

External links
Official website

Spartan South Midlands Football League
1972 establishments in England
Association football clubs established in 1972
Football clubs in Bedfordshire
Football clubs in England
South Midlands League